Polk Township is one of the sixteen townships of Crawford County, Ohio, United States. As of the 2010 census the population was 2,132.

Geography
Located in the southeastern corner of the county, it borders the following townships:
Jefferson Township - north
Jackson Township - northeast
Sandusky Township, Richland County - east
North Bloomfield Township, Morrow County - southeast
Washington Township, Morrow County - southwest
Whetstone Township - west

The city of Galion is located in central Polk Township.

Name and history
Polk Township was named for President James K. Polk.

It is the only Polk Township statewide.

Government
The township is governed by a three-member board of trustees, who are elected in November of odd-numbered years to a four-year term beginning on the following January 1. Two are elected in the year after the presidential election and one is elected in the year before it. There is also an elected township fiscal officer, who serves a four-year term beginning on April 1 of the year after the election, which is held in November of the year before the presidential election. Vacancies in the fiscal officership or on the board of trustees are filled by the remaining trustees.

References

External links
County website

Townships in Crawford County, Ohio
Townships in Ohio